Karol Chodura (9 September 1921 - 22 March 2001) is a Polish cinematographer and first assistant director. A graduate of National Film School in Łódź.

Filmography

Cinematographer
 Little Dramas (1960)
 The Wrecks (1957)
 Five Boys from Barska Street (1954)
 Peace Will Overcome (1951) (documentary)

Camera operator
 Boomerang (1966)
 The Last Stage (1947)
 Forbidden Songs (1947)

First assistant director
 On the Silver Globe (1988)
 Smaller Sky (1980)
  (1979)
 Man – Woman Wanted (1973)
 Knights of the Teutonic Order (1960)

References

External links
 

Polish cinematographers
Polish film directors
People from Cieszyn
1921 births
2001 deaths